Woodplumpton is a civil parish in the City of Preston, Lancashire, England.  It contains 20 listed buildings that are recorded in the National Heritage List for England.  Of these, one is at Grade II*, the middle grade, and the others are at Grade II, the lowest grade.  The parish contains the villages of Woodplumpton and Catforth, and the smaller settlements of Eaves and Lower Bartle, but is otherwise rural.  The Lancaster Canal passes through the parish, and three bridges crossing it are listed.  The oldest building in the parish is St Anne's Church; this and four structures associated with it, or nearby, are listed.  The other listed buildings are houses and associated structures, farmhouses, and farm buildings.

Key

Buildings

References

Citations

Sources

Lists of listed buildings in Lancashire
Buildings and structures in the City of Preston